Park Hee-young (born 1987) is a South Korean golfer.

Park Hee-young may also refer to:

 Park Hee-young (footballer, born 1985)
 Park Hee-young (footballer, born 1991)